Michael Whitfield (born 17 October 1962) is an English former professional footballer who played as a midfielder for Sunderland.

References

1962 births
Living people
Footballers from Sunderland
English footballers
Association football midfielders
Sunderland A.F.C. players
Hartlepool United F.C. players
Darlington Town F.C. players
English Football League players